25 & Alive: Live at Brixton Academy is the seventh live album by the band Motörhead, 
released as a double live CD in December 2003 on Steamhammer, featuring their 25th anniversary concert at Brixton Academy in London on 22 October 2000. This is their second live album and seventh album released with the label and the first live album under distribution with Sanctuary Records and their subsidiary Metal-Is for North America and certain territories.

The concert was filmed and has an accompanying live DVD called 25 & Alive Boneshaker released in November 2001. Both CD and DVD are exactly the same recordings.

Various guests made appearances on the night; "Fast" Eddie Clarke (ex-Motörhead), Queen's Brian May, Todd Campbell (Phil's son), Paul Inder (Lemmy's son), Whitfield Crane (ex-Ugly Kid Joe), Doro Pesch (ex-Warlock) and Ace (Skunk Anansie).

Track listing

Personnel

Motörhead 
 Lemmy – lead vocals, bass
 Phil Campbell – lead guitar
 Mikkey Dee – drums

Guests musicians 
 Whitfield Crane (ex-Ugly Kid Joe, ex-Medication), vocals on "Born to Raise Hell".
 Doro Pesch (ex-Warlock), vocals on "Born to Raise Hell".
 "Fast" Eddie Clarke (ex-Motörhead, ex-Fastway), guitar on "The Chase Is Better than the Catch" and "Overkill".
 Todd Campbell (Phil Campbell's son, S.K.W.A.D.), guitar on "Killed by Death".
 Paul Inder (Lemmy's son), guitar on "Killed By Death".
 Brian May (Queen), guitar on "Overkill".
 Ace (ex-Skunk Anansie), guitar on "Overkill".

Production
Ian Kilmister – producer 
Phil Campbell – producer
 Mikkey Dee with SPV GmbH/Steamhammer – producer
Dave "Hobbs" Hilsden – tour manager, engineer 
Tony Beeton – lighting director
Tim Butcher – bass tech
Roger De Souza – guitar tech
Alex Parmee – drum tech
Freddie Lind – production coordination

References

Motörhead live albums
2003 live albums
SPV/Steamhammer live albums
Albums recorded at the Brixton Academy